Sergei Nikolayevich Balakhnin (born 26 November 1959) is a Russian professional football coach and a former player.

Career
As a player, he made his debut in the Soviet Second League in 1979 for FC Rostselmash Rostov-on-Don.

His older brother Aleksandr Balakhnin also played football professionally.

References

1959 births
Living people
Soviet footballers
Russian footballers
FC Rostov players
Russian Premier League players
FC SKA Rostov-on-Don players
Russian football managers
FC Rostov managers
Russian Premier League managers
Soviet expatriate footballers
Russian expatriate footballers
Expatriate footballers in Finland
People from Belaya Kalitva
FC Sibir Novosibirsk managers
Association football midfielders
FC Kuban Krasnodar players
Sportspeople from Rostov Oblast